Van der Hagen is a Dutch-language toponymic surname, meaning "from/of the "haag". A haag was a bushland, hedged lot, or (private) hunting ground. The name could also specifically refer to an origin in The Hague (since 1242 known as De Hage and variant spellings). Some variant spellings of the name are Van der Haagen, Van der Haegen, Van der Haeghen, Van der Hage, and Van der Haghen. People with such names include:

Abraham van der Haagen (1587–1639), Dutch painter and engraver
Alf van der Hagen (born 1962), Norwegian journalist
Amand Vanderhagen (1753–1822), Flemish clarinetist and teacher
Gaspar van der Hagen (fl 1744-1769), Flemish sculptor and ivory carver
Joris van der Haagen (c.1615–1669), Dutch landscape painter
Steven van der Hagen (1563–1621), Dutch sailor, first admiral of the Dutch East India Company
Willem van der Haegen (1430–1510), Flemish-born Azorean nobleman, explorer, and colonizer
Willem Van der Hagen (died 1745), Dutch painter active in Ireland

See also
Vanderhaeghe, alternative spelling of the name
Verhagen, contracted form of the surname

References

Dutch-language surnames
Surnames of Dutch origin
Dutch toponymic surnames